The Henry C. Gale House at 95 E. 500 North in Beaver, Utah was built in 1897.  It was listed on the National Register of Historic Places in 1983.

It was built by Henry Gale, who was not known as a stonemason, although he built one other house.  Gale may have quarried the stone for this house.

See also
Henry C. Gale House (495 N. 1st East)

References

		
National Register of Historic Places in Beaver County, Utah
Buildings and structures completed in 1897